Casey Narelle Dumont (born 25 January 1992) is an Australian international soccer player who plays for Australian W-League team Melbourne Victory.

Early life and biography
Dumont was born in 1992 in Sydney and was brought up on the Gold Coast. In 2013, Dumont qualified as a registered nurse.

Club career

Early career
Dumont started her career with Palm Beach and Gold Coast before joining the W-League with Brisbane Roar, with whom she won three trophies and Sydney FC before joining Western Sydney Wanderers in 2016.

Melbourne Victory
On 18 September 2017, Dumont joined Melbourne Victory. Dumont missed the 2020–21 W-League season due to injury, but re-signed with Melbourne Victory ahead of the 2021–22 A-League Women season. In May 2022, Dumont was named the A-League Women Goalkeeper of the Year for the first time as Melbourne Victory won the 2021–22 A-League Women.

Honours

Club
Brisbane Roar
 W-League Premiership: 2008–09
 W-League Championship: 2008–09, 2010–11

Melbourne Victory
 W-League Premiership/A-League Women: 2018–19, 2021–22

International
Australia
 AFC Women's Asian Cup: 2010
 AFC Olympic Qualifying Tournament: 2016

Individual
 A-League Women Goalkeeper Of The Year: 2021–22

References

External links
 

1992 births
Living people
Australian women's soccer players
Brisbane Roar FC (A-League Women) players
Sydney FC (A-League Women) players
Western Sydney Wanderers FC (A-League Women) players
Melbourne Victory FC (A-League Women) players
A-League Women players
2011 FIFA Women's World Cup players
Sportswomen from New South Wales
Soccer players from Sydney
Australia women's international soccer players
Women's association football goalkeepers
21st-century Australian women